The following is a list of episodes for the Disney XD sitcom Zeke and Luther. The series premiered on June 15, 2009, and concluded on April 2, 2012. The episodes are arranged in broadcast order.

Series overview

Episodes

Season 1 (2009–10)

Season 2 (2010)

Season 3 (2011–12)

References

Lists of American sitcom episodes
Lists of American children's television series episodes
Lists of Disney Channel television series episodes